WKMK and WTHJ (106.3 and 106.5 FM, "Thunder 106") are two radio stations simulcasting a country music format. The stations are licensed to Eatontown and Bass River Township, New Jersey, respectively. The station is owned by Press Communications. WKMK's transmitter is located at exit 105 of the Garden State Parkway in Tinton Falls. WTHJ's transmitter is located on the tower of Philadelphia television station WWSI/62 located in Tuckerton in extreme southern Ocean County.  The studios are located in Neptune, New Jersey.

The 106.3 WKMK signal reaches Staten Island to the north, Toms River to the south and Hightstown to the west. The 106.5 WTHJ signal reaches Brick Township to the north, Ocean City to the south and Philadelphia to the west.

History

WTHJ history
This facility was originally allocated to Ocean City and broadcast from that city as WSLT-FM on 106.3 MHz, beginning around 1970. The station broadcast with beautiful music, adult contemporary and classical formats until a local marketing agreement led to a country format and the new call sign of WKOE. More format changes ensued, but none of them made much of an impact on the Atlantic City market and the owners eventually applied to move the station to its present location and frequency. On July 6, 2006, WKOE swapped frequencies with WBBO, which had been simulcasting WHTG-FM on 98.5 FM and was known as B98.5 prior to that. From August 2005 to January 2009 it simulcasted G 106.3 in Ocean County and South Jersey. On January 19, 2009, the format switched to Top 40 along with WHTG-FM. On December 8, 2010, the WBBO call letters reverted to the FM station on 98.5 MHz licensed to Ocean Acres, NJ, near Manahawkin, NJ. Concurrently the station on 106.5 MHz in bass River Township, NJ, became WTHJ.

WHTG history
WHTG-FM first signed on at the 105.5 MHz frequency on October 11, 1961, as the sister station of WHTG (1410 AM). The station was named for Harold and Theo Gade, its first owners and operators. Eventually, the Gades' daughter Faye became general manager of the station. Faye Gade assumed ownership of the station in 1985.

Interference with WDHA in northern New Jersey resulted in the move to its current 106.3 MHz frequency in 1965, which had been vacated in 1963 when WFHA in Red Bank, NJ, discontinued operations.

Primarily a Beautiful Music station, it also broadcast Adult Standards (e.g. popular vocalists like Frank Sinatra) and big bands in the evenings alongside its sister station until 1983, then Adult Contemporary music up to the switch to Alternative rock in August, 1984. The AM station officially split off from the FM station in the summer of 1984 Kevin Dunn was named Program Director for the AM station. WHTG-AM began offering its own format of adult contemporary, and eventually, oldies music, using many of the personalities from its beautiful music days as a new airstaff was assembled to take over the rock music now the norm on the FM.  The station started to play emerging local bands such as Red House, Dramarama, the Blases and the Whirling Dervishes along with national alternative sounds from artists such as Bolshoi, Flesh for Lulu, the Del-Lords, Social Distortion and Hüsker Dü.

Air personalities on WHTG at this time included Jack Scott, Kevin Dunn, Don Brennan, Ray Knight, Jeff Michaels (now known as Jeff Rafter), Vince Hartnett, James Theadoracopulous (who used the air name "J.T. Copulous"), Chuck Weigel, Phil Matthews, Rich Robinson, Drew Williamson, Rich O'Reilly, Dave Mackey, Chuck Rossi, Mike Marrone, and Matt Pinfield.

WHTG-AM still broadcasts on 1410-AM

Freeform

In the very early FM 106–3 days, the station had somewhat of a free-form approach, with DJs who were alternative rock fans picking what music they played, from Pixies to Prince. During the mid-1980s, The Smiths and other Manchester Sound artists were especially favored by the station's jocks. By that time Rich Robinson had become program director and was slowly nudging ownership into a more contemporary format. DJ Matt Pinfield, who started at the station in 1984 and had, by the early nineties, become Program Director, was noted for being extremely knowledgeable of alternative and independent artist information when introducing tracks. He later was seen spouting that knowledge as the 2nd host of MTV's "120 Minutes".

In the 1980s, the station referred to itself as, Your Rock Alternative, FM 106.3.
For a brief period in the early nineties, the station used a slogan of "Real Rock Radio, FM 106.3."
In the nineties, its signature copy became, FM 106.3, Modern Rock at the Jersey Shore.

WHTG achieved its highest ratings ever in 1993 and 1994 when it received "favorite radio station" honor in Rolling Stones annual readers' polls. The station garnered "underground" marketing support in the form of widespread application of the station's logo (at right) upon traffic signs throughout the state. The vinyl stickers were quite durable and available free at Jersey area independent music shops.

Ownership change

In November 2000, WHTG was sold to Press Communications. WHTG then became known as G106.3, and took on a format that could be described as a hybrid of alternative and modern adult contemporary. Later, WHTG had then evolved into an alternative rock station that played current and re-current alternative hits, as well as heritage artists such as The Cure and REM. Before the acquisition of WBBO, WHTG was referred to as G106.3, Your Rock Alternative, echoing—perhaps unwittingly—FM 106.3's original alternative-era slogan from 1985 to 1989.

G Rock Radio also featured special programming on weekend mornings. The Saturday Morning Breakfast Club took a nostalgic look at alternative rock from the 1980s, while Common Threads (a program that dates back to the FM 106-3 era and originally featured "theme" sets of songs) showcased modern acoustic music. With the acquisition of WBBO, G106.3 became known as "G-Rock Radio", with a simulcast on 106.3 and 98.5. In July 2006, WBBO's 98.5 signal was moved to 106.5. During this time, G-Rock was trimulcasted on 98.5, 106.3, and 106.5 to assist listeners in the frequency transition. G-Rock later dropped their weekday noon request show called "90's at Noon" for a more 80's influenced request show known as "The Retro Request Hour". Another specialty show heard on Sunday nights called The Underground, which featured indie bands as well as b-sides and unknown tracks from current played artists, which was dropped in March 2007. On June 24, 2007, specialty programming on Sunday nights returned with "The Punkyard", which consisted of two hours of punk music. By spring 2008, other weekend programming on G Rock included the all-request "Radio Kaos" from 7 pm – midnight Saturdays. There also was "Queens of Noise" on Sundays from 9-10 pm, which featured female-fronted bands and solo rock artists.

Hit 106
On January 19, 2009, the previous alternative rock format heard on WHTG and WBBO was dropped in the middle of the day with no advance notice in favor of a Top 40 format, known as "Hit 106". The last song was Le Disko by Shiny Toy Guns.

A Facebook group known as Bring Back GRock! formed to protest the format change. Membership in the group peaked at over 10,700. A protest outside of Press Communications was held the week of the change, attended by about 200 people. In a letter posted in response to the protest, CEO of Press Communications Robert McAllan lambasted the G Rock Radio fans for their perceived reluctance to fill out Arbitron surveys, adding that he hoped that they would tune into the new station, which counted Justin Timberlake, 50 Cent, Pink and Fall Out Boy among its core artists.

Thunder 106
On September 15, 2010, at 3:00 p.m., Press Broadcasting's "Thunder" country format swapped formats and call signs with Hit 106, with "Thunder" now broadcasting on the renamed WKMK and WBBO-FM and the hit music format moved to the 98.5 frequency in Ocean Acres, now known as WHTG-FM. the first song on Thunder 106  was  "Country Done Come To Town" by John Rich. WHTG-FM is once again known as "B 98.5".

This came only twenty months after the sudden format change on January 19, 2009, when both WHTG-FM and WBBO dropped the long-time alternative format and switched to the Top 40 format, identifying themselves as Hit 106.

Airstaff
The current lineup is as followsPork Roll & Eggs (6–10 am): Nina Lippart & Tom DevoyMiddays (10 am – 3pm): Zach RaymentThe Afternoon Ride (3–7 pm): Chris VanZantCountry Nights (7 pm–midnight): TJ MateoWeekends/Fill-ins: Joe StephensProgram Director/Music Director:' Chris VanZant

References

External links
 
 List of airstaff from WHTG's FM106.3 period (1984–2000)

KMK
Country radio stations in the United States
Radio stations established in 1961
Bass River Township, New Jersey
Eatontown, New Jersey